Tricholomopsis decora, commonly known as prunes and custard, is a species of gilled mushroom in the genus Tricholomopsis. It occurs in North America and in Britain, and it grows in conifer forests. It is regarded as nonpoisonous.

Gallery

References

External links
 
 

decora